Duncan McLachlan (30 October 1893 – 15 September 1958) was a New Zealand cricketer. He played five matches of first-class cricket for Canterbury and Otago between 1913 and 1922.

A left-arm medium-pace bowler, McLachlan took 22 wickets in seven days in two first-class matches on Canterbury's northern tour in January 1915. On 6 and 7 January, against Hawke's Bay in Hastings, he took 7 for 57 and 5 for 17 in Canterbury's innings victory. On 9, 11 and 12 January he took 4 for 59 and 6 for 43 against Wellington at the Basin Reserve, Wellington; Canterbury won by 92 runs.

See also
 List of Otago representative cricketers

References

External links
 

1893 births
1958 deaths
New Zealand cricketers
Canterbury cricketers
Otago cricketers
Cricketers from Dunedin